Sali Herman  (12 February 1898 – 3 April 1993) was a Swiss-born Australian artist, one of Australia's Official War Artists for the Second World War.

Life and career
Herman arrived in Melbourne in 1937 and enlisted in the Australian Army in 1941. In 1945, he was appointed an Official War Artist, painting at several places in the Pacific such as Rabaul. He submitted 26 paintings to the Australian War Memorial.

Sali Herman was known for paintings of inner city streets and slums in Sydney. He was awarded the Sulman Prize in 1946 for Natives carrying wounded soldiers, and also in 1948 for The Drovers. He won the Wynne Prize four times; in 1944 for McElhone Stairs; in 1962 for The Devil's Bridge, Rottnest; again in 1965 for The Red House; and in 1967 for Ravenswood I.

Collections
Herman's works are held by the Art Gallery of New South Wales including Sleeping Cat (1983), Summer night, Mullerup (1975), Lane at the Cross (1946), and Yetta (1919); the Australian War Memorial including Native compound at Lae (1945), Surrender (1946), and Back Home (1946); the National Gallery of Australia including McElhone Stairs (1944), The Drovers (1947), and Saturday Morning (1948); the National Gallery of Victoria including Kirribilli (1959), and The Law Court (1946); the Cbus collection; the Benalla Art Gallery; the Newcastle Art Gallery; and the Rockhampton Art Gallery.

Exhibitions

Group
 Aspects of Australian Figurative Painting 1942-1962: Dreams, Fears and Desires, S. H. Ervin Gallery, Sydney (1984), part of the 5th Sydney Biennale, painting exhibited: Reconstruction (1950)
 Swiss Artists in Australia: 1777-1991 Art Gallery of New South Wales, Sydney (1991), paintings exhibited: Surry Hills Backyards (1958), Fremantle Brewery (1963), Ming (1963), Surry Hills Lane (1965), The Red House (1966), Balmain (1968), B.H.P. (1969), Summer Night, Mullerup (1975), Forum, Rome (1976), Sydney 1942 (1981), My World (1990).

Further reading
Sali Herman by Daniel Thomas, Collins (1971) OCLC No. 37079520
Swiss Artists in Australia 1777-1991 pp67-84 (exhibition catalogue), Art Gallery of NSW (1991)

References

External links 
 Australian War Memorial
 listing of Herman's works at the National Gallery of Australia
 listing of Herman's works at the Art Gallery of NSW
 listing of Herman's works at the Australian War Memorial
 listing of Herman's works at the National Gallery of Victoria
 Australian Dictionary of Biography Herman entry

1898 births
1993 deaths
Australian Companions of the Order of St Michael and St George
Australian painters
Australian war artists
Swiss emigrants to Australia
Swiss war artists
World War II artists
Wynne Prize winners
20th-century Swiss painters
20th-century male artists
Swiss male painters